The Olive Branch is a public house and restaurant located in the Rutland village of Clipsham. Clipsham is close to the A1, near Stamford, Lincolnshire. , the restaurant holds one star in the Michelin Guide.

Beech House, across the road from The Olive Branch, offers six luxury bedrooms and suites.

The Olive Branch was awarded the titles of Michelin Pub of the Year 2008 and The Good Pub Guide Inn of the Year 2008.

References

External links
The Olive Branch

Buildings and structures in Rutland
Michelin Guide starred restaurants in the United Kingdom
Restaurants in Rutland
Pubs in Rutland